Ramangan (also Romanized as Ramangān and Ramengān; also known as Damangān) is a village in Naharjan Rural District, Mud District, Sarbisheh County, South Khorasan Province, Iran. At the 2006 census, its population was 27, in 5 families.

References 

Populated places in Sarbisheh County